The men's canoe slalom K-1 event at the 2016 Summer Olympics in Rio de Janeiro took place from 7 - 10 August at the Olympic Whitewater Stadium.

Schedule 
All times are Brasília Time (UTC−3).

K-1 slalom men

References

Men's slalom K-1
Men's events at the 2016 Summer Olympics